The Donaldsonville Chief is a weekly newspaper published in Donaldsonville, Louisiana. It is owned by Gatehouse Media. The Donaldsonville Chief is a member of the Louisiana Press Association. News content for the publication is based in the City of Donaldsonville, but also includes the Ascension Parish area. The newspaper has won numerous Louisiana Press Association awards

History
The Donaldsonville Chief was founded in 1871. Linden E. Bentley founded the newspaper as a weekly Republican journal. According to the newspaper's masthead, it is the longest continuous publication in Ascension Parish. The current editor is Greg Fischer.

References

External links
The Donaldsonville Chief Web site
Gatehouse Media

Newspapers published in Louisiana
Donaldsonville, Louisiana